Thegalea is a genus of moths of the family Noctuidae.

Species
 Thegalea haemorrhanta (Hampson, 1909)

References
Natural History Museum Lepidoptera genus database
Thegalea at funet

Hadeninae